Elena Kononenko is a retired Ukrainian swimmer who won a gold medal in the 4×100 m medley relay at the 1991 European Aquatics Championships. The same year she won a national title in the 100 m butterfly event.

References

Living people
Ukrainian female swimmers
Female butterfly swimmers
Soviet female swimmers
European Aquatics Championships medalists in swimming
Year of birth missing (living people)